Cameron Joseph Nizialek (born March 10, 1995) is an American football punter for the Seattle Sea Dragons of the XFL. He played college football at Georgia and Columbia.

College career
Nizialek began his collegiate career at Columbia and did not play as a freshman. As a senior, he led the Ivy League with 44.8 yards per punt on 34 attempts and was named second-team All-conference. After the season, he enrolled at Georgia as a graduate transfer after considering offers from Clemson, Virginia Tech and South Carolina. Nizialek averaged 45 yards per punt on 61 attempts in his lone season at Georgia.

Professional career

Atlanta Legends
Nizialek played for the Atlanta Legends of the Alliance of American Football. He served as the team's punter until the AAF ceased operations and averaged 47.4 yards per punt.

Baltimore Ravens
Nizialek was signed by the Baltimore Ravens on August 17, 2019. He was cut by the team during final roster cuts on August 30, 2019.

Jacksonville Jaguars
On December 22, 2020, Nizialek signed with the Jacksonville Jaguars’ practice squad. He signed a reserve/futures contract on January 4, 2021. He was waived on March 17, 2021.

Atlanta Falcons
Nizialek was signed to the Atlanta Falcons practice squad on September 6, 2020, before being released on October 1, 2020. Nizialek was re-signed by the Falcons on August 3, 2021. He was placed on injured reserve on October 5, 2021. He was released on November 9.

Pittsburgh Steelers
On December 25, 2021, Nizialek was signed to the Pittsburgh Steelers practice squad. He was released on January 4, 2022. He signed a reserve/future contract with the Steelers on January 26, 2022. He was released on August 16, 2022.

Seattle Sea Dragons 
On November 17, 2022, Nizialek was drafted by the Seattle Sea Dragons of the XFL.

References

External links
Columbia Lions bio
Georgia Bulldogs bio
Atlanta Falcons bio

Living people
1995 births
American football punters
Atlanta Falcons players
Atlanta Legends players
Baltimore Ravens players
Columbia Lions football players
Georgia Bulldogs football players
Players of American football from Virginia
Pittsburgh Steelers players
Seattle Sea Dragons players